Sixto Diaz Rodriguez (born July 10, 1942), known professionally as Rodriguez, is an American singer-songwriter from Detroit, Michigan. Though his career was initially  met with little fanfare in the United States, he found success in South Africa, Australia (touring the country twice), and New Zealand. Unbeknownst to him for decades, his music was extremely successful and influential in South Africa, where he is believed to have sold more records than Elvis Presley, as well as other countries in southern Africa. Information about him was scarce, and it was incorrectly rumored there that he had committed suicide shortly after releasing his second album.

In the 1990s, determined South African fans managed to find and contact Rodriguez, which led to an unexpected revival of his musical career. This was told in the 2012 Academy Award-winning documentary film Searching for Sugar Man and helped give Rodriguez a measure of fame in his home country. In May 2013, Rodriguez received an honorary Doctor of Humane Letters degree from his alma mater, Wayne State University, in Detroit.

Rodriguez has been living in Detroit's historic Woodbridge neighborhood, through which he is seen walking in Searching for Sugar Man. He lives a simple life, possessing no telephone, and occasionally visits bars in the Cass Corridor section of Detroit near Woodbridge and Midtown, such as the Old Miami pub, where he has performed live concerts for small local crowds.

Biography

Early life

Rodriguez was born in 1942 in Detroit, Michigan. He was the sixth child of Mexican immigrant working-class parents. He was named Sixto (pronounced "Seex-toh") because he was their sixth son. His father had emigrated to the United States from Mexico in the 1920s; his mother was Native American. They had joined a large influx of Mexicans who came to the midwest to work in Detroit's industries. Mexican immigrants at that time faced both intense alienation and marginalization. In most of his songs, Rodriguez takes a political stance on the difficulties that faced the inner city poor.

Rodriguez earned a Bachelor of Philosophy from Wayne State University's Monteith College in 1981.

Recording career
In 1967, using the name "Rod Riguez" (given by his record label), he released a single, "I'll Slip Away", on the small Impact label. He did not record again for three years, until he signed with Sussex Records, an offshoot of Buddah Records. He used his preferred professional name, "Rodriguez", after that. He recorded two albums with Sussex, Cold Fact in 1970 and Coming from Reality in 1971. However, both sold few copies in the U.S. and he was quickly dropped by Sussex, which itself closed in 1975. At the time he was dropped, he was in the process of recording a third album which has never been released.

Rodriguez quit his music career and in 1976 he purchased a derelict Detroit house in a government auction for $50 (US$ in  dollars) in which he still lived as of 2013. He worked in demolition and production line work, always earning a low income. He remained politically active and motivated to improve the lives of the city's working-class inhabitants and has run unsuccessfully several times for public office: for the Detroit City Council in 1989, for Mayor of Detroit in 1981 and 1993 and for the Michigan House of Representatives in 2000.

In 2013, it was announced that Rodriguez was in discussions with Steve Rowland, the producer of his Coming From Reality album. "I've written about thirty new songs," Rodriguez told Rolling Stone magazine. "He told me to send him a couple of tapes, so I'm gonna do that. I certainly want to look him up, because now he's full of ideas."

Overseas fame
Although Rodriguez remained relatively unknown in his home country, by the mid-1970s his albums were starting to gain significant airplay in Australia, Botswana, New Zealand, South Africa and Zimbabwe.

When imported copies of his Sussex albums were sold out, an Australian record label, Blue Goose Music, bought the Australian rights to his recordings. Blue Goose released his two studio albums as well as a compilation album, At His Best, that featured unreleased recordings from 1973 – "Can't Get Away", "I'll Slip Away" (a re-recording of his first single), and "Street Boy".

At His Best went platinum in South Africa, which at one stage was the major disc-press source of his music to the rest of the world. Rodriguez was compared to contemporaries such as Bob Dylan and Cat Stevens. Many of his songs carry anti-establishment themes, and therefore boosted anti-apartheid protest culture in South Africa where his work influenced the music scene at the time and was also a considerable influence on a generation drafted, mostly unwillingly, to the then whites-only South African military. Reportedly, anti-apartheid activist Steve Biko was also a Rodriguez fan.

Rodriguez was also successful in Australia and performed two concert tours across the country in 1979 and 1981.

In 1991, both of his albums were released on CD in South Africa for the first time, which helped preserve his fame. However, few details of his life were known to his fans and it was rumored that he had killed himself during a concert in the 1970s.

Despite his success abroad, Rodriguez's fame in South Africa had remained unknown to him until 1997 when his eldest daughter, Eva, came across a website dedicated to him. After contacting the website and learning of his fame in the country, Rodriguez went on his first South African tour, playing six concerts before thousands of fans. A documentary, Dead Men Don't Tour: Rodriguez in South Africa 1998, was screened on SABC TV in 2001. He also performed in Sweden before returning to South Africa in 2001 and 2005.

In 1998, Rodriguez's signature song, "Sugar Man", was covered by the South African rock band Just Jinger and the Scottish singer-songwriter Paolo Nutini. In 2002, it was used by disc-jockey David Holmes to open his mix album, Come Get It I Got It, gaining Rodriguez more international airplay. "Sugar Man" had previously gained even more fame by having been sampled in the song "You're Da Man" in rapper Nas's 2001 album Stillmatic.

In April 2007 and 2010, he returned to Australia to play at the East Coast Blues & Roots Music Festival, as well as sell out shows in Adelaide, Melbourne and Sydney. His song "Sugar Man" was featured in the 2006 film Candy, starring Heath Ledger. Singer-songwriter Ruarri Joseph covered Rodriguez's song "Rich Folks Hoax" for his third studio album. Irish singer-songwriter Darragh O'Dea mentions Rodriguez and references "Inner City Blues" in his 2020 single "Lost Dog Loyal". Rodriguez continues to tour in various countries.

Rodriguez's albums Cold Fact and Coming from Reality were re-released by Light in the Attic Records in 2009.

In 2014, the French deep house and electro music producer The Avener released a new version of "Hate Street Dialogue" originally appearing in Rodriguez's album Cold Fact. The new version by The Avener features Rodriguez's vocals. The release charted in France.

Searching for Sugar Man

In 2012, the Sundance Film Festival hosted the premiere of the documentary film Searching for Sugar Man, by Swedish director Malik Bendjelloul, detailing the efforts of two South African fans to see if his rumored death was true and, if not, to discover what had become of him. The documentary, produced by Simon Chinn and John Battsek, went on to win the World Cinema Special Jury Prize and the Audience Award, World Cinema Documentary.

In addition to playing at other film festivals including the True/False Film Festival and the Traverse City Film Festival, the film opened in New York and Los Angeles on July 27, 2012, before a larger domestic cinematic run. It was also screened as part of cinema programs in some European music festivals during the summer of 2012, including the Way Out West festival in August, where Rodriguez also performed. In November it won both the Audience Award and the Best Music Documentary Award at the International Documentary Film Festival Amsterdam.

The Searching for Sugar Man soundtrack features a compilation of Rodriguez tracks from his albums Cold Fact and Coming from Reality, in addition to three previously unreleased songs from his third unfinished album. The album was released on July 24, 2012. To allay possible concerns raised in the film about how Rodriguez was apparently cheated by his previous record label, the back cover bears the statement, "Rodriguez receives royalties from the sale of this release."

Searching for Sugar Man won the BAFTA Award for Best Documentary on February 10, 2013.

On January 13, 2013, Searching for Sugar Man was nominated for and, on February 24, 2013, won the Academy Award for Best Documentary Feature at the 85th Academy Awards. Rodriguez declined to attend the award ceremony as he did not want to overshadow the filmmakers' achievement. Upon accepting his award, Chinn remarked on such generosity, "That just about says everything about that man and his story that you want to know." Malik Bendjelloul also said on stage, "Thanks to one of the greatest singers ever, Rodriguez."

Belated success in the United States
Since the cinematic release of Searching for Sugar Man in 2012, Rodriguez has experienced a flush of media exposure and fan interest in the United States, as well as Europe. He appeared as a musical guest on the Late Show with David Letterman on August 14, 2012, performing "Crucify Your Mind", and performed "Can't Get Away" on The Tonight Show with Jay Leno on January 11, 2013.

Prominent news coverage has included a mid-August 2012 CNN feature story with an interview of Rodriguez discussing his life and career resurgence. On October 7, 2012, Rodriguez was featured on the U.S. television news program 60 Minutes. On November 18, 2012, Rodriguez was interviewed on the U.K. Sunday morning news program The Andrew Marr Show, where he also played a short song over the closing credits. He performed on the BBC2 program Later... with Jools Holland on November 16, 2012, and was interviewed by Holland. Additionally, he has performed on Internet web series shows such as The Weekly Comet.

The film Searching for Sugar Man strongly implies that Rodriguez may have been cheated out of royalties over the years, specifically by Clarence Avant. This matter is still under investigation, and the legal issues are complicated. Rodriguez first expressed indifference to these "symbols of success" but has then filed a lawsuit in 2013. In 2015, the lawsuit was reported to have been settled with no amount disclosed.

In addition to concerts in Australia, South Africa and New Zealand, Rodriguez's tour schedule for 2013 included his most highly attended U.S. concerts to date, such as a stint at the Beacon Theatre in New York City in April and a spot at the 2014 Sasquatch Music Festival at The Gorge Amphitheatre, as well as other concerts in Europe. He played on the Park Stage at the Glastonbury Festival, U.K., in June 2013. On July 5, 2013, Rodriguez opened the Montreux Jazz festival. On August 10, 2013, he headlined at the Wilderness Festival in the U.K. In 2015, he opened for Brian Wilson's tour with Wilson, Al Jardine and Blondie Chaplin of The Beach Boys.

Rodriguez received additional marketing in 2014 as the Dave Matthews Band often covered "Sugar Man" in their summer tour. Matthews would often preface the song with his experience as a fan of Rodriguez growing up in South Africa and his surprise at Rodriguez's lack of popularity in the United States.

Recent activity
In 2015, Craig Bartholomew Strydom and Stephen "Sugar" Segerman published a book entitled Sugar Man: The Life, Death and Resurrection of Sixto Rodriguez. A review in Business Day called the book "probably one of the most unusual rock 'n roll stories out there".

Rodriguez continues to tour the United States and Canada. He headlined a tour in August 2018, ending with a hometown show at Detroit's Garden Theater.

Rodriguez and the process of his rediscovery was the subject of a 2022 episode of Outlook on the BBC World Service.

Personal life
Rodriguez has three daughters: Eva, Sandra, and Regan, and is separated from his second wife, Konny Koskos. His family is heavily involved in his career and he often takes them along on the road.

Discography

Albums
 Studio albums
 1970: Cold Fact
 1971: Coming from Reality

 Live albums
 1981: Rodriguez Alive (Australia)
 1998: Live Fact (South Africa)
 2016: Rodriguez Rocks: Live In Australia (Australia)
 Compilations
 1976: After the Fact (reissue of Coming from Reality) (South Africa)
 1977: At His Best (Australia)
 1982: The Best of Rodriguez (South Africa)
 2005: Sugarman: The Best of Rodriguez (South Africa)
 2012: Searching for Sugar Man (soundtrack)
 2013: Coffret Rodriguez (2-CD set of Cold Fact and Coming from Reality) FR #114

Album reissues

Singles

Singles featured in

"Sugar Man" is also included in the 2006 Australian film Candy.

References

External links

 The article on Sixto's ethnicity.
 
 
 September 2008 interview with the L.A. Record
 Guardian (UK) article
 Sydney Morning Herald article
 Official reissue 2008
 Cold Fact review
 Interview on RocknRollDating
 Mail & Guardian February 20, 1998: Fact: Rodriguez lives
 The Mystery of the Sugar Man, The Economist, 2012

1942 births
20th-century American singers
21st-century American singers
American folk singers
American musicians of Mexican descent
American folk guitarists
American rock singers
Living people
American rock songwriters
American male singer-songwriters
Wayne State University alumni
American rock guitarists
American acoustic guitarists
American male guitarists
20th-century American guitarists
21st-century American guitarists
Singers from Detroit
Guitarists from Detroit
20th-century American male singers
21st-century American male singers
Hispanic and Latino American musicians
Singer-songwriters from Michigan